Powder River  is a tributary of the Yellowstone River, approximately  long in northeastern Wyoming and southeastern Montana in the United States. Combined with its tributary, the South Fork Powder River, it is 550 miles long. It drains an area historically known as the Powder River Country on the high plains east of the Bighorn Mountains.

It rises in three forks in north central Wyoming. The North and Middle forks rise along the eastern slope of the Bighorn Mountains. The South Fork rises on the southern slopes of the Bighorn Mountains west of Casper. The three forks meet on the foothills east of the Bighorns near the town of Kaycee.  The combined stream flows northward, east of the Bighorns, and into Montana. It is joined by the Little Powder near the town of Broadus, and joins the Yellowstone approximately  downriver from Miles City, Montana.  The Powder River was so named (in the English language as well as in local indigenous languages) because the sand along a portion of its banks resembles powder or dust.

See also

Powder River Country
Fort McKinney (Wyoming)
List of Wyoming rivers
List of rivers of Montana
Montana Stream Access Law

Notes

Rivers of Montana
Rivers of Wyoming
Bodies of water of Prairie County, Montana
Bodies of water of Custer County, Montana
Tributaries of the Yellowstone River
Bodies of water of Johnson County, Wyoming